Yaan  is a 2014 Indian Tamil-language action thriller film written, directed and filmed by Ravi K. Chandran. It stars Jiiva and Thulasi Nair. This was the second and final Tamil film of leading actress, Thulasi as the latter further quoted of unable to enjoy the deeds of acting. As it never appealed to her taste. The film's soundtrack and score was composed by Harris Jayaraj, while editing and art direction were done by A. Sreekar Prasad and Sabu Cyril, respectively. Resul Pookutty was in charge of the sound mixing and Brinda was in charge of the choreography. The movie was reported to be based on the 1978 movie Midnight Express. It was dubbed in Hindi as Jaan Ki Baazi by Goldmines Telefilms in December 2016.

Plot
The film begins in Mumbai where cops plan the encounter of terrorist Malik Shah (Nawab Shah), who is a notorious criminal. The cops succeed in trapping him, and Police Commissioner Anwar Ali (Jayaprakash) kills Malik. Then comes Chandrasekhar alias Chandru (Jiiva), a happy-go-lucky, jobless youth who is an MBA graduate and lives in his grandmother's expense. Chandru meets Sreela (Thulasi Nair) on the day of the encounter and helps her elope the spot, saving her life. Chandru falls for Sreela at first sight and starts to follow her. Though initially, she refuses him, they both fall in love soon. As usual, Sreela's father Rajan (Nassar) opposes their marriage as Chandru is jobless and does not have an income. Hence, Chandru decides to find a job with full fledge. He finally gets a job offer in 'Basilistan', a strict Islamic nation. Chandru travels to Basilistan with the help of a travel agent named Haridas (Bose Venkat). He also introduces Iqbal (Danush Bhaskar), an autistic teen boy to Chandru, who is also travelling to Basilistan for a work and asks Chandru to take care of him until they reach Basilistan, Morocco.

A shock awaits Chandru and Iqbal, as they are arrested in Basilistan airport for carrying drugs. In the court, Chandru sees a man named Abdul Rashid, a wealthy entrepreneur from Basilistan, who resembles Malik. Chandru is interrogated by the officials. He claims that he is innocent but is sent to prison with a note that drug trafficking is a punishable offence in Basilistan, and he will be killed by the officials. Chandru understands that it was a trap set up by Haridas. Chandru meets Chinna (Thambi Ramaiah), an inmate at the jail who is a Tamil guy. Chinna is arrested for a small crime and is about to be released soon. Chinna tells Chandru that if someone from India can help him find a lawyer at Basilistan, he will get bail and will be released. Chandru sends a note for Sreela through Chinna, and Sreela decides to help Chandru. With Anwar's help, Sreela travels to Basilistan to rescue Chandru. She meets a Tamil taxi driver who drives her to the jail. On the way, they witness the execution of the criminals. She is shocked to see Chandru among the group and is deeply hurt. Luckily for Chandru, the execution did not happen because of the broken sword whilst executing Imran. He is taken back to jail. Chandru escapes the jail and meets Sreela. They both escape the place with the taxi driver's help.

Meanwhile, it is revealed that Rashid is none other than Malik himself, who faked the encounter with a dummy. Fearing that his identity will be revealed by Chandru, he follows Chandru and Sreela to kill them. They cross the Basilistan border with a camel, and Malik gets killed. Finally, Chandru and Sreela escape from Basilistan.

Cast

 Jiiva as K.Chandrasekhar (Chandru)
 Thulasi Nair as Sreela Rajan 
 Nassar as Rajan
 Nawab Shah as Sultan Malik Shah (Terrorist) /Abdul Rashid
 Jayaprakash as Anwar Ali
 Thambi Ramaiah as Chinna
 Karunakaran as Shaji
 Arjunan as Shiva
 Bose Venkat as Haridas
 Rishi as Ram
 Urmila Unni as Lakshmi
 Danush Bhaskar as Iqbal
 Alpesh Dhakan
 Bobby Bedi
 Neha Chauhan as Isha

Production

Development
In December 2012, cinematographer Ravi K. Chandran announced that he would make his directorial debut with a film Yaan featuring Jiiva in the lead role. It was reported that Elred Kumar, owner of production company R. S. Infotainment, would produce the film  and that Kajal Aggarwal would play the female lead but the role went to Thulasi Nair. Elred Kumar, in an interview to The Times of India said that Ravi K. Chandran and Jiiva wanted to pitch a story to him, and he was initially hesitant at first as he thought that Chandran would come up with an arty subject, but he immediately agreed to produce the film when Chandran came up with an action story. Jiiva was said to play Chandru, an unemployed MBA graduate with a "happy-go-lucky nature", while Thulasi Nair's character, Sreela, was a "sincere, responsible girl" who is just out of college. Stuntman Mustapha Touki, who had worked in films like Babel (2006), The Bourne Ultimatum (2007) and Zero Dark Thirty (2012), was hired to choreograph the action and stunt sequences. Karunakaran was selected to play a supporting role, in a role originally written for Prakash Raj. This movie is almost a remake of Midnight Express, a 1978 American/British film directed by Alan Parker.

Filming
The film's launch was held at Gokuldham Temple, Goregaon, Mumbai in November 2012, where photoshoots were done. In March 2013, about 65% of the film was completed in Chennai, Hyderabad and Karjat. Further shooting was done in Morocco, where a lot of action sequences were filmed, and also shooting was done in the Andaman and Nicobar Islands, Mumbai and Iceland. The lead pair changed 50 costumes each for the song sequence of Latcham Calorie in the film. Two song sequences were shot in Switzerland. The climax portions were wrapped up by the beginning of August 2014, along with further schedules in Rajasthan. On 2 September 2014, Jiiva confirmed on his Twitter account that the shooting of the film was completed.

Music

Harris Jayaraj composed the soundtrack album, scoring for Jiiva for the fourth time. Lyrics were written by Vaali, Pa. Vijay, Thamarai and Kabilan. Harris recorded the songs in New York, Florida, Haiti, Jamaica and Mexico. The album was released on 12 May 2014. In early September 2014. Harris began work on the background score of the film. On 12 September 2014, Harris confirmed that the background score for the first half of the film had been completed.

The soundtrack received generally positive reviews from critics. S. R. Ashok Kumar of The Hindu described "Aathangara Orathil" as "interesting and energetic" and "Nenje Nenje" as "charming", while also stressing that "Latcham Calorie" "is sure to strike a chord with listeners". Behindwoods rated the album 3 out of 5 and stated that it had "some new ideas within Harris's popular template". Indiaglitz described the tracks on the album as "sweet pills from Harris to get completely mesmerised in," with praise being dedicated to "Aathangara Orathil" for its unique combination of Kuthu and Rap music, "Nee Vandhu Ponadhu" for its blend of Carnatic and Trance music and "Latcham Calorie" for its "instantly likeable tune".  Karthik of Milliblog provided a mixed review and stated that, "But for "Hey Lamba Lamba" and "Nenje Nenje", Yaan is Yawn".

Release
The film's release was earlier planned for June 2014  but it was pushed to October 2014. Dream Factory bought the film's worldwide distribution rights. The theatrical release rights of the film in Chennai, Chengalpattu and Madurai went to Gopuram films.

The trailer of the film was launched on 3 September 2014 and received positive response.
The teaser features Jiiva in a police uniform confirming that he would portray the role of a police officer in the film. Bollywood Life wrote in its teaser review, "With few gunshots and blasts and lots and lots of running, Yaan seems to be an intense action thriller. It looks like we are in for a roller coaster cat and mouse chase between our hero and the baddies." The Trailer reached 400,000 hits in 3 days on YouTube. The trailer crossed 1 million views on 14 September 2014.
A video clip of the song "Aathangara Orathil" was premiered on Zee Thamizh on 17 September 2014.

Critical reception
The film received mixed to negative reviews from critics. Baradwaj Rangan from The Hindu wrote, "Ravi K Chandran is a great cinematographer — of that, there is little doubt. But his first outing as writer-director, Yaan, is a major disappointment". M. Suganth of The Times of India gave 2 out of 5 and wrote, "...despite all the colours on the screen, this is such a dull, flavourless film, let down by the writing, which is preposterous and uninspiring". Rediff gave the film 2 stars out of 5 as well and wrote, "Aside from the exceptional camera work, there is nothing remarkable about Yaan", going on to call it "a long, tedious and completely over-the-top action drama" and a "terrible bore". IANS gave it a score of 1 out of 5 and wrote, "Jiiva has been an actor for nearly a decade and he should know best what will be accepted by the audience. Chandran has worked as a cinematographer for over two decades and he should've known better too. Together they've produced a film that makes you yawn in boredom". Sify wrote, "Yaan is a mixed bag and the noted cameraman turned director seems to be largely influenced by Bollywood flicks. It is well made, glossy but lacks a proper script". Behindwoods rated the film 2 out of 5 and wrote, "Yaan has solid milieu, at least on paper. However, it is let down by a very weak narration". silverscreen.in writing, "Except for picture perfect visuals, there is hardly anything memorable about this film. One can't think of a single memorable song or line or performance, even though there was a solid technical team to back up the director". Cinemalead rated a 2 out of 5 and wrote, "Wannabe glossy commercial which goes berserk."

Box office
Yaan released across 350 screens worldwide. The film collected  on the first day of its release in Tamil Nadu.

Plagiarism allegations
Although Ravi K. Chandran initially claimed that Yaan was an original script inspired by a true incident, Elred Kumar realised he had substantially plagiarised the British film Midnight Express (1978). Kumar later sent a legal notice to Chandran for "breaching the agreement he had signed that the story is original".

References

External links
 

2014 films
2014 action thriller films
Films shot in Morocco
2010s Tamil-language films
Films scored by Harris Jayaraj
Indian action thriller films
Films shot in Mumbai
Films shot in Chennai
Films shot in Switzerland
Films shot in Hyderabad, India
Films shot in Rajasthan
Films involved in plagiarism controversies
Films set in a fictional country
2014 directorial debut films